Charybdis is a genus of swimming crabs in the family Portunidae; "Charybdis" is Greek for whirlpool.

Species
The genus Charybdis contains the following species:

Subgenus Charybdis (Charybdis) De Haan, 1833
Charybdis acuta (A. Milne-Edwards, 1869)
Charybdis acutidens Türkay, 1986
Charybdis affinis Dana, 1852
Charybdis amboinensis Leene, 1938
Charybdis anisodon (De Haan, 1850)
Charybdis annulata (Fabricius, 1798)
Charybdis beauforti Leene & Buitendijk, 1949
Charybdis brevispinosa Leene, 1937
Charybdis callianassa (Herbst, 1789)
Charybdis cookei Rathbun, 1923
Charybdis crosnieri Spiridonov & Türkay, 2001
Charybdis curtilobus Stephenson & Rees, 1967
Charybdis demani Leene, 1937
Charybdis feriata (Linnaeus, 1758)
Charybdis gordonae Shen, 1934
Charybdis granulata (De Haan, 1833)
Charybdis hawaiensis Edmondson, 1954
Charybdis hellerii (A. Milne-Edwards, 1867)
Charybdis heterodon Nobili, 1905
Charybdis holosericus (Fabricius, 1787)
Charybdis ihlei Leene & Buitendijk, 1949
Charybdis incisa Rathbun, 1923
Charybdis japonica (A. Milne-Edwards, 1861)
Charybdis jaubertensis Rathbun, 1924
Charybdis javaensis Zarenkov, 1970
Charybdis lucifera (Fabricius, 1798)
Charybdis meteor Spiridonov & Türkay, 2001
Charybdis miles (De Haan, 1835)
Charybdis natator (Herbst, 1794)
Charybdis orientalis Dana, 1852
Charybdis padadiana Ward, 1941
Charybdis philippinensis Ward, 1941
Charybdis rathbuni Leene, 1938
Charybdis riversandersoni Alcock, 1899
Charybdis rosea (Hombron & Jacquinot, 1846)
Charybdis rostrata (A. Milne-Edwards, 1861)
Charybdis rufodactylus Stephenson & Rees, 1968
Charybdis sagamiensis Parisi, 1916
Charybdis salehensis Leene, 1938
Charybdis seychellensis Crosnier, 1984
Charybdis spinifera (Edward J. Miers|Miers, 1884)
Charybdis vannamei Ward, 1941
Charybdis variegata (Fabricius, 1798)
Charybdis yaldwyni Rees & Stephenson, 1967
Subgenus Charybdis (Goniohellenus) Alcock, 1899
Charybdis curtidentata Stephenson, 1967
Charybdis hongkongensis Shen, 1934
Charybdis hoplites (Wood-Mason, 1877)
Charybdis longicollis Leene, 1938
Charybdis omanensis Leene, 1938
Charybdis ornata (A. Milne-Edwards, 1861)
Charybdis padangensis Leene & Buitendijk, 1952
Charybdis philippinensis Ward, 1941
Charybdis pusilla Alcock, 1899
Charybdis smithii MacLeay, 1838
Charybdis truncata (Fabricius, 1798)
Charybdis vadorum Alcock, 1899
Subgenus Charybdis (Gonioneptunus) Ortmann, 1894
Charybdis africana Shen, 1935
Charybdis bimaculata (Miers, 1886)
Charybdis orlik Zarenkov, 1970
Subgenus Charybdis (Goniosupradens) Leene, 1938
Charybdis acutifrons (De Man, 1879)
Charybdis erythrodactyla (Lamarck, 1818)
Charybdis obtusifrons Leene, 1937
Incertae sedis
Charybdis paucidentata (A. Milne-Edwards)
Charybdis sexdentata (Herbst, 1783)

Charybdis affinis
Charybdis affinis has a hexagonal, concave carapace with a yellowish-grey colour. This crab is found in the Indian Ocean and in the West Pacific.

Charybdis feriata
Charybdis feriata is found in the Indian and Pacific Oceans, from Japan, China and Australia to Southern Africa and the Persian Gulf. It is an edible crab and because of its large size, high quality of meat and relatively soft exoskeleton, it has a high commercial value. Attempts are being made to farm this crab using aquaculture. In Hong Kong Cantonese it is known as the flowery crab (花蟹). This name probably arises from its red and white colouring when cooked. This species of crab is also known as Charybdis feriatus and Charybdis cruciata, and has also been found in the Mediterranean Sea. The specific epithet cruciata refers to the red cross on the carapace of this species. According to tradition the Spanish Jesuit missionary Saint Francis Xavier saw this crab in Indonesia. "".

Charybdis hellerii

Charybdis hellerii is characterised by a hexagonal, concave carapace with a mottled brownish-grey colour. This crab originates from the Indo-West Pacific, from the Red Sea to New Caledonia. However this crab has now also successively invaded the Western Atlantic (Florida to Brazil) and the Mediterranean Sea.

Charybdis japonica

It occurs naturally in the waters around Japan, Korea and Malaysia, but has become an invasive species in New Zealand.

Charybdis lucifera

Charybdis (Charybdis) lucifera, the Yellowish-brown crab, is a species of swimming crab in the family Portunidae. 
The type locality of this species is Indian Ocean, probably Tranquebar. It occurs naturally in the waters around Bangladesh, Malaysia, India, Singapore, Pakistan, Sri Lanka, Indonesia, Taiwan, Thailand, Australia, Italy (Invasive species), Egypt (Invasive species), Mediterranean Sea (Invasive species).

Charybdis longicollis
Charybdis longicollis is an invasive species from the Red Sea that invaded the Mediterranean Sea fifty years ago.

Charybdis natator
Charybdis natator is characterised by a brownish upper surface with some white spots among the wafts or bright red granules. On its under surface it is bluish, mottled with white and pale red. This crab is not a major target for commercial fishing.

Charybdis miles 
Though Charybdis miles was originally designated as its own species, it now actually refers to a group of different species including C. acutidens, C. meteor, C. riversandersoni, C. crosnieri, and C. sagamiensis. Unlike most portunid crabs, most species belonging to this group inhabit the deep sea.

References

External links

Portunoidea
Taxa named by Wilhem de Haan